This article gives an incomplete list of locomotives, motor cars, and passenger cars used by PeruRail and by Inca Rail, working in parallel to PeruRail, and owning the motor cars numbered above 900.

PeruRail Diesel locomotives

passim  
PeruRail reported 26 Diesel locomotives in 2002.

PeruRail and Inca Rail Railcars

passim 
PeruRail reported ten DMU's in 2002, which included two ex-Bolivian railcars that had not by then entered service.  The remaining eight DMU's at the time were ##216-217 and 220–225.  Later, one of the ex-Bolivian railcars may have become #232.

PeruRail Passenger Cars

passim

Former FC Cuzco-Machu Picchu-Santa Ana (FCCSA) Narrow Gauge Steam Locomotives

passim

Railroad-owned Vessels on Lake Titicaca

passim

See also 
 Railtransport in Peru

References

Bibliography

, reproduced in, American Steam Locomotive Builders Lists (2010). Tap Lines.
Inventory of Locomotives and Rolling Stock (1999), §§3.1, 3.2, “Material Tractivo, Material Rodante de Concesion,” at pp. 93–96, Anexo No. 3, Proceso de Promoción de la Inversión Privada en Enafer S.A.: Contrato de Concesión [“Concession Tractive Stock, Rolling Stock,” Annex No. 3, Process for the Promotion of Private Investment in Enafer, S.A.: Concession Contract] (July 19, 1999), contract file pp. 2122–25, at, https://portal.mtc.gob.pe/transportes/concesiones/documentos/contarto%20ferrocarril%20sur%20y%20sur%20oriente.pdf (Mar. 24, 2021).  See, also, contract file pp. 2052, 2035 (details of Titicaca Lake vessels Manco Capac, Ollanta, and dredge Zuñiga).

 
Rail transport-related lists
Railway locomotive-related lists